Piedmont Television was a broadcasting company in the United States that owned television stations in smaller markets.  The company was based in Charlotte, North Carolina.

Piedmont was founded in 1996 as Grapevine Communications, and was originally based in Atlanta, Georgia.  The company merged with GOCOM Communications in 1999; it inherited GOCOM's Charlotte headquarters and changed its name to GOCOM Holdings.  In 2003, the name was again changed to Piedmont Television (the GOCOM name is now used by another company that owns WRSP-TV/WCCU in Springfield/Urbana, Illinois; that company is partially connected to Piedmont).

The company sold its stations to various owners in 2007.

Stations formerly owned by Grapevine/GOCOM/Piedmont
Stations are arranged alphabetically by state and by city of license.

References

Defunct television broadcasting companies of the United States
Mass media companies established in 1996
Mass media companies disestablished in 2008